Bogoroditsky (masculine), Bogoroditskaya (feminine), or Bogoroditskoye (neuter) is the name of several rural localities in Russia.

Modern localities

Belgorod Oblast
As of 2014, one rural locality in Belgorod Oblast bears this name:

Bogoroditskoye, Belgorod Oblast, a selo in Gubkinsky District;

Kaluga Oblast
As of 2014, one rural locality in Kaluga Oblast bears this name:
Bogoroditskoye, Kaluga Oblast, a village in Sukhinichsky District

Kursk Oblast
As of 2014, two rural localities in Kursk Oblast bear this name:
Bogoroditskoye, Gorshechensky District, Kursk Oblast, a selo under the administrative jurisdiction of Gorshechnoye Work Settlement in Gorshechensky District
Bogoroditskoye, Shchigrovsky District, Kursk Oblast, a selo in Znamensky Selsoviet of Shchigrovsky District

Lipetsk Oblast
As of 2014, two rural localities in Lipetsk Oblast bear this name:

Bogoroditskoye, Dobrinsky District, Lipetsk Oblast, a selo in Bogoroditsky Selsoviet of Dobrinsky District; 
Bogoroditskoye, Dobrovsky District, Lipetsk Oblast, a selo in Paninsky Selsoviet of Dobrovsky District;

Oryol Oblast
As of 2014, three rural localities in Oryol Oblast bear this name:

Bogoroditskoye, Khotynetsky District, Oryol Oblast, a selo in Bogoroditsky Selsoviet of Khotynetsky District; 
Bogoroditskoye, Krasnoarmeysky Selsoviet, Sverdlovsky District, Oryol Oblast, a selo in Krasnoarmeysky Selsoviet of Sverdlovsky District; 
Bogoroditskoye, Novopetrovsky Selsoviet, Sverdlovsky District, Oryol Oblast, a village in Novopetrovsky Selsoviet of Sverdlovsky District;

Pskov Oblast
As of 2014, two rural localities in Pskov Oblast bear this name:
Bogoroditskoye, Krasnogorodsky District, Pskov Oblast, a village in Krasnogorodsky District
Bogoroditskoye, Velikoluksky District, Pskov Oblast, a village in Velikoluksky District

Rostov Oblast
As of 2014, one rural locality in Rostov Oblast bears this name:

Bogoroditskoye, Rostov Oblast, a selo in Bogoroditskoye Rural Settlement of Peschanokopsky District;

Ryazan Oblast
As of 2014, two rural localities in Ryazan Oblast bear this name:
Bogoroditskoye, Miloslavsky District, Ryazan Oblast, a selo in Bogoroditsky Rural Okrug of Miloslavsky District
Bogoroditskoye, Ukholovsky District, Ryazan Oblast, a selo in Bogoroditsky Rural Okrug of Ukholovsky District

Smolensk Oblast
As of 2014, three rural localities in Smolensk Oblast bear this name:
Bogoroditskoye, Smolensky District, Smolensk Oblast, a village in Kozinskoye Rural Settlement of Smolensky District
Bogoroditskoye, Vyazemsky District, Smolensk Oblast, a selo in Maslovskoye Rural Settlement of Vyazemsky District
Bogoroditskoye, Yelninsky District, Smolensk Oblast, a village in Bobrovichskoye Rural Settlement of Yelninsky District

Tambov Oblast
As of 2014, three rural localities in Tambov Oblast bear this name:
Bogoroditskoye, Tambov Oblast, a selo in Yekaterininsky Selsoviet of Nikiforovsky District
Bogoroditskaya, Morshansky District, Tambov Oblast, a village in Starotomnikovsky Selsoviet of Morshansky District
Bogoroditskaya, Petrovsky District, Tambov Oblast, a village in Volchkovsky Selsoviet of Petrovsky District

Tula Oblast
As of 2014, three rural localities in Tula Oblast bear this name:
Bogoroditskoye, Chernsky District, Tula Oblast, a village in Popovskaya Rural Administration of Chernsky District
Bogoroditskoye, Dubensky District, Tula Oblast, a village in Luzhensky Rural Okrug of Dubensky District
Bogoroditskoye, Venyovsky District, Tula Oblast, a village in Rassvetovsky Rural Okrug of Venyovsky District

Voronezh Oblast
As of 2014, one rural locality in Voronezh Oblast bears this name:
Bogoroditskoye, Voronezh Oblast, a settlement in Dmitriyevskoye Rural Settlement of Paninsky District

Alternative names
Bogoroditskaya, alternative name of Bogoroditskoye, a selo in Bogoroditsky Selsoviet of Khotynetsky District in Oryol Oblast; 
Bogoroditskoye, alternative name of Bogorodskoye, a selo in Denisovsky Selsoviet of Meleuzovsky District in the Republic of Bashkortostan; 
Bogoroditskoye, alternative name of Bogorodskoye, a selo in Shemetovskoye Rural Settlement of Sergiyevo-Posadsky District in Moscow Oblast; 
Bogoroditskoye, alternative name of Khormaly, a selo in Khormalinskoye Rural Settlement of Ibresinsky District in the Chuvash Republic;